Lancaster City is a ghost town in Lawrence County, in the U.S. state of South Dakota.

History
Lancaster City was named for Nimrod Lancaster, who laid out the mining community in 1877.

References

Geography of Lawrence County, South Dakota
Ghost towns in South Dakota